Morton Smith (May 28, 1915 – July 11, 1991) was an American professor of ancient history at Columbia University. He is best known for his reported discovery of the Mar Saba letter, a letter attributed to Clement of Alexandria containing excerpts from a Secret Gospel of Mark, during a visit to the monastery at Mar Saba in 1958. This letter fragment has had many names, from The Secret Gospel through The Mar Saba Fragment and the Theodoros.

Biography
Smith was born in Philadelphia on May 28, 1915. He received his bachelor's degrees from Harvard College and the Harvard Divinity School, a Ph.D. from Hebrew University in Jerusalem and a Th.D. in theology from Harvard Divinity School. He taught at Brown University and Drew University and then he became a teacher at Columbia University in 1957. He became professor emeritus in 1985 and continued as a lecturer in religion until 1990. He died of heart failure on July 11, 1991 in New York City.

Smith was well known for his sharp wit when it came to religious debates. He made regular scholarly contributions in many fields, including but not limited to Greek and Latin classics, New Testament, Patristics, second-temple Judaism and rabbinics. Despite the numerous accusations of forgery against Smith's finding, Smith was seen as a dedicated scholar when it came to research. He devoted fifteen years of his life to just studying his finding of the Secret Gospel.

Mar Saba letter

In 1941, Smith, at age 26, was on a trip to the holy land with the Harvard Divinity School. Due to issues relating to the war, he was stuck in Jerusalem, where he made acquaintances with a leader of the Greek Orthodox Church, who gave him a tour of various places, one of which happened to be the Mar Saba monastery. While there, Smith was given access to the libraries of the monastery. Years later, in 1958, having landed a teaching career at Columbia, Smith was awarded a sabbatical. With his sabbatical, Smith decided to return to Mar Saba, having since become very interested in the Mar Saba library. He recalled that during his first visit, the library had been a  terrible mess, and according to Smith no one had bothered to catalog it.

Smith reported he found the manuscript in the Mar Saba monastery in 1958, photographed it carefully, and then left the book where he found it. He first publicized the discovery in 1960 but, due to various delays, his main publications on the subject did not come out until 1973.

Mar Saba is a Greek Orthodox monastery overlooking the Kidron Valley in the West Bank east of Bethlehem. In 1973 Smith published a book in which he wrote that he had discovered a previously unknown letter of Clement of Alexandria (c.150 - c. 215) while cataloging documents there in the summer of 1958.

Right from the start, some scholars voiced the opinion that the letter is not authentic, and that it was either an ancient or medieval forgery. In 1975, Quentin Quesnell published a lengthy article in the Catholic Biblical Quarterly, where he even suggested that Smith had forged the document himself, and then photographed his alleged forgery. An incensed Smith issued a furious rebuttal, whereupon Quesnell disclaimed any personal accusations against Smith.

In 1985 in his Strange Tales Per Beskow of Lund cast doubt on the Gospel. Smith responded by threatening to sue the publisher, Fortress Press of Philadelphia, "for a million dollars" and the publisher amended the offending paragraph.

Smith is featured discussing the Mar Saba letter in the UK television documentary series, Jesus: The Evidence (1984: Channel 4).

Contribution to Old Testament studies 
Smith's contribution to Old Testament studies was contained in his Palestinian Parties and Politics That Shaped the Old Testament (1971). Using form criticism to reconstruct the social background to the Old Testament, Smith advanced the proposal that two parties had vied for supremacy in ancient Israel, the first composed of those which worshipped many gods of which Yahweh was chief, while the other, the "Yahweh-alone" faction, was largely the party of the priests of Jerusalem, who wished to establish a monopoly for Yahweh. In monarchic Judah the Yahweh-alone party were a permanent minority; although sometimes able to win over a king like Josiah to their cause. Meanwhile, the population at large, including most of the kings, remained stubbornly polytheistic, worshipping the same gods as their neighbours in Moab, Ammon etc. In the post-Exilic period the idea of Yahweh as the only god of Israel finally triumphed, but a new division emerged, between the separatists, who wished the Jews to remain strictly apart from their neighbours, (this separation being defined in terms of purity), and the assimilationists who wished for normal relations with them. Ultimately, by the late Persian/early Hellenistic period, the purists won, the modern version of the Hebrew Bible was written, and a recognisably modern Judaism emerged.

Smith was admired and feared for his extraordinary ability to look at familiar texts in unfamiliar ways, to re-open old questions, to pose new questions, and to demolish received truths. He practiced the "hermeneutics of suspicion" to devastating effect. His answers are not always convincing but his questions cannot be ignored.

Publications

Books:

 Tannaitic Parallels to the Gospels (1951)
 The Ancient Greeks (1960)
 Heroes and Gods: Spiritual Biographies in Antiquity [in collaboration with Moses Hadas] (1965)
 Palestinian Parties and Politics That Shaped the Old Testament (1971)
 Clement of Alexandria and a Secret Gospel of Mark (1973)
 The Secret Gospel (1973)
 The Ancient History of Western Civilization [with Elias Bickerman] (1976)
 Jesus the Magician: Charlatan or Son of God? (1978)
 Hope and History (1980)
 Studies in the Cult of Yahweh. Vol. 1. Historical Method, Ancient Israel, Ancient Judaism. Vol. 2. New Testament, Early Christianity, and Magic [edited by Shaye J. D. Cohen] (1996)
 What the Bible Really Says (edited with R. Joseph Hoffmann (1992)).

Awards
Lionel Trilling Book Award for Jesus the Magician
Ralph Marcus Centennial Award of the Society of Biblical Literature

References

Bibliography
 Stephen C. Carlson, The Gospel Hoax, Baylor University Press, 2005.
 Scott G. Brown, Mark's Other Gospel, Wilfrid Laurier, 2005.
 Scott G. Brown, Factualizing the Folklore: Stephen Carlson's case against Morton Smith, Harvard Theological Review, July 1, 2006.  Available on-line (see below).
 Peter Jeffery, The Secret Gospel of Mark Unveiled, Yale University Press, 2006.
 Charles W. Hedrick and Nikolaos Olympiou, Secret Mark, in The Fourth R 13:5 (2000): 3–11, 14–16.  Contains color plates of the manuscript. Available on-line (see below).
 Gedaliahu A. G. Stroumsa,Comments on Charles Hedrick’s Article: A Testimony, Journal of Early Christian Studies 11:2 (Summer 2003): 147–53.  Tells about the four scholars who saw the manuscript in the Mar Saba library.

External links
 
 Is the Secret Gospel of Mark a Modern Forgery Based on a Cheesy Christian Novel?
 This website by Wieland Willker contains Smith's complete English translation of the manuscript, his original photos of it, the Greek text, and plenty of background material
 This website (pages from a book; PDF format) contains much more information about the physical history of the manuscript, and the four scholars who actually saw it. In addition, it tells us that the second set of photographs (done by the Jerusalem library) were in color, and have been published
 Second Thoughts on the Secret Gospel, by Robert M Price
 Secret Mark, by Hedrick and Olympiou (with color plates)
 Factualizing the Folklore: abstract of Brown's article
 "Morton Smith's translation of Hekhalot Rabbati"
Did Morton Smith Forge ‘Secret Mark’? A Handwriting Expert Weighs In Biblical Archaeology Society

1915 births
1991 deaths
American biblical scholars
Critics of the Christ myth theory
Columbia University faculty
Harvard College alumni
Hebrew University of Jerusalem alumni
Brown University faculty
Educators from Philadelphia
Harvard Divinity School alumni
20th-century American historians
American male non-fiction writers
Historians from Pennsylvania
20th-century American male writers